Alexei Nikolayevich Klishin (born 1 October 1973) is a retired Kazakh football midfielder.

Career statistics

International

Statistics accurate as of 22 March 2017

International goals

Notes

External links

1973 births
Living people
Kazakhstani footballers
Association football midfielders
Kazakhstan international footballers
Kazakhstan Premier League players
Skonto FC players
FC Kairat players
FC Shakhter Karagandy players
Kazakhstani expatriate footballers
Expatriate footballers in Estonia
Kazakhstani expatriate sportspeople in Estonia
Expatriate footballers in Latvia
Kazakhstani expatriate sportspeople in Latvia
FC Megasport players